The  is a skyscraper located in Yokkaichi, Mie Prefecture, Japan. Construction of the 100-metre, 14-storey skyscraper was finished in 1999.

External links

  

Commercial buildings completed in 1999
Yokkaichi
Skyscrapers in Japan
Buildings and structures in Mie Prefecture
1999 establishments in Japan